Ronnie Sharp (born 30 January 1948) is a former professional footballer who played in the North American Soccer League and Mexican Primera División.

Career
Born in Scotland, Sharp began his football career with junior side Glenrothes. The winger played part-time with Scottish Second Division side Cowdenbeath from 1968 to 1973. Miami Toros' coach John Young scouted Sharp on a trip to Scotland, and he joined the NASL club in 1973. During the off-season, Sharp and teammates Warren Archibald and Steve David joined Mexican side San Luis for five weeks of the 1973–74 Mexican Primera División season.

Sharp returned to the Miami Toros for three more seasons before finishing his career with the Fort Lauderdale Strikers in 1977. He was named to the 1975 NASL All-Star team.

Sharp owned the Fort Lauderdale Sun of the United Soccer League in 1984, but was forced to sell the team shortly after winning the USL championship, because of his involvement in a Texas marijuana smuggling operation. In September 1984 he testified as a witness for the U.S. government, as part of a plea deal. Sworn testimony indicated that Sharp was more likely a middle-man than an active participant in the operation.

References

1948 births
Living people
Scottish footballers
Cowdenbeath F.C. players
North American Soccer League (1968–1984) players
North American Soccer League (1968–1984) indoor players
Miami Toros players
Fort Lauderdale Strikers (1977–1983) players
San Luis F.C. players
Liga MX players
Scottish Football League players
Association football wingers
Scottish expatriate footballers
Expatriate soccer players in the United States
Expatriate footballers in Mexico
Scottish expatriate sportspeople in the United States
Scottish expatriate sportspeople in Mexico
Glenrothes F.C. players
Scottish Junior Football Association players